Armaiolo is a village in Tuscany, central Italy, administratively a frazione of the comune of Rapolano Terme, province of Siena. At the time of the 2001 census its population was 79.

Armaiolo is about 26 km from Siena and 2 km from Rapolano Terme.

References 

Frazioni of Rapolano Terme